Shed of the Dead is a 2019 British comedy horror film directed by Drew Cullingham and produced by Nicholas David Lean & James Fisher.

Plot

Trevor is between jobs, and spends his days in the company of equally unemployable friend Graham painting figurines and war gaming fantasy worlds in his allotment shed. After he accidentally kills one of his neighbours, when they try to have him evicted from his plot, the dead begin to rise forcing Trevor to make a life changing decision. Whether to rescue his wife, as the adopted alter ego of his fantasies, Casimir, or leave her to an uncertain fate.

Cast
 Spencer Brown as Trevor
 Kane Hodder as Mr Parsons
 Michael Berryman as Derek
 Bill Moseley as Doc
 Brian Blessed as Narrator
 Ewen MacIntosh as Graham
 Lauren Socha as Bobbi
 Emily Booth as Harriet

Production

Director Drew Cullingham first discussed ideas for the film during a visit to a pub with Nick Lean and producing partner James Fisher.

The film was first announced in March 2015, with the director and cast being announced and the first poster being released.

Filming began in October 2015 in the UK. Filming occurred in Bexleyheath & Sidcup and Leytonstone.

References

External links
 

2019 comedy horror films
British comedy horror films
British horror films
British zombie comedy films
2019 films
2019 comedy films
2010s English-language films
2010s British films